Esperantina may refer to:

 Esperantina, Piauí, a city in the Northeast Region of Brazil
 Esperantina, Tocantins, a city in the North Region of Brazil